Deacetylvindoline is a terpene indole alkaloid produced by Catharanthus roseus.  Deacetylvindoline is the product of a hydroxylation of desacetoxyvindoline by deacetoxyvindoline 4-hydroxylase (D4H).  It is a substrate for deacetylvindoline O-acetyltransferase (DAT) which acetylates a hydroxy group to form vindoline, one of the two immediate precursors for the formation of the pharmacetucially valuable bisindole alkaloid vinblastine.

References

Carbazoles
Tryptamine alkaloids